L'Imagination symbolique (literally The Symbolic Imagination) is a philosophical anthropology book from French anthropologist Gilbert Durand. The first edition was issued in 1964. Durand reprises his influential concept of the anthropological trajectory, and he proposed a "tactical pedagody of the imaginary."

Some passages from the essay are revisited version of Dudans's 1954 publication in SUP.: Initiation philosophique. Among the differences, the change in terminology from "cultures apolliniennes" to "régime diurne," and from "cultures dionysiennes" to "régime nocturne"; the earlier terminology followed that of Ruth Benedict and Nietzsche, while the new terminology follows what Durand formulated in 1960 with The Anthropological Structures of the Imaginary.

Editions and translations
1970 象徴の想像力 / Shōchō no sōzōryoku, translated by Akira Unami
1971 La imaginación simbólica, published by Amorrortu Editores
1999 L'immaginazione simbolica, translated by Anna Chiara Peduzzi
1988 A imaginação simbólica
1998 Sembolik imgelem, Translated by Ayşe MERAL

See also
Collective unconscious
Ernst Cassirer (1944) An essay on man
Imaginary (sociology)

Notes and references

External links
L'Imagination symbolique snippet view at Google books
L'imagination symbolique info page at PUF (Presses Universitaires de France)

Anthropology books
Philosophical anthropology
Philosophical literature